Pseudopetalichthys problematica is a lightly armored pseudopetalichthyid placoderm from the Hunsrückschiefer Lagerstätte of Early Devonian Germany. The specimen superficially resembles Stensioella,<ref name=Denison>{{cite book|last=Denison|first=Robert|title=Placodermi Volume 2 of Handbook of Paleoichthyology'''|year=1978|publisher=Gustav Fischer Verlag|location=Stuttgart New York|isbn=978-0-89574-027-4|pages=22–24}}</ref> though the structures of the mouth, and orbits (the orbits being unknown in Stensioella), and placement of the gill rakers all differ.

Some experts suggest that P. problematica and the related Paraplesiobatis'' are the same species, suggesting that the differences between them are merely due to different circumstances of taphonomy, but this hypothesis can not be tested until more specimens are found.

The holotype was originally held in the Schlosspark Museum in Bad Kreuznach, but was then lost at an unknown date.

References

External links
 Pseudopetalichthys at the Paleobiology Database

Pseudopetalichthyida
Placoderm genera
Fossils of Germany

Hunsrück Slate fossils